The Eastern Bloc of the Revolutionary Armed Forces of Colombia, from September 2010 known as Bloque Comandante Jorge Briceño, in honour of the slain guerrilla leader, was considered to be the strongest military faction of the guerrilla group. It was divided into groups of 50–400 combatants in each group, which patrolled and controlled different areas of Colombia's Eastern and Central-Eastern territory, as well as helped to carry out the killings, taxation, and arrests necessary to advance the organization's financial and political goals.

The specific divisions of the group are arguable. Some of the believed divisions or 'fronts', as they were commonly called, are shown below. Many of these fronts sometimes worked together towards a certain mission, while others were further divided into 'columns' and 'companies' with a smaller number of members. For more general information see FARC Chain of Command.

Commanders
This group of commanders was called the "EMBO" (Estado Mayor del Bloque Oriental).

1st Front
Also known as the Armando Ríos Front, it was composed of around to 400 people.  It operated mostly in the Guaviare Department.

7th Front
Also known as the Jacobo Prías Alape Front, it was composed of up to 400 people. It operated mostly in the Meta Department.

10th Front
Also known as the Guadalupe Salcedo Front, it was composed of up to 300 people. It operated mostly in the Arauca Department.

Several police officers infiltrated one of the FARC’s 10th front camp in early 2008, preparing an attack on the camp by a police squadron. The attack came on July 29, killing 'Jurga Jurga', FARC commander and friend of FARC head ‘Mono Jojoy’. The ground offensive was follow by an airforce attack, killing 20 guerrillas, unofficial sources said. On October 22, 2011, members of the front killed 10 Colombians soldiers in an ambush in Arauca. On March 17, 2012, alleged members of the 10th front killed 11 members of the Colombian army. Security forces launched an offensive few days after the attack: on March 20, 3 alleged member of the FARC are killed and 4 captured by the army. On March 21, 33 FARC members were allegedly killed and 5 others captured.

16th Front
Also known as the Jose A. Paez Front, it was composed of up to 300 people. It operated mostly in the Vichada Department.

22nd Front
Also known as the Simón Bolívar Front, it was composed of up to 120 people. It operated mostly in the Cundinamarca Department.

26th Front
Also known as the Hermogenes Maza Front, it was composed of up to 130 people. It operated mostly in the Meta Department. As of 2011 this front operated in La Uribe, Vista Hermosa, La Macarena and other municipalities.

27th Front
It was composed of up to 500 people and operated mostly in the Meta Department.

28th Front
Also known as the José María Córdoba Front, it was composed of up to 120 people. It operated mostly in the Casanare and Boyacá Departments.

31st Front
This front was composed by up to 120 combatants and operated mostly in the Meta Department. Its activity diminished notoriously after its head, Duván Alberto Cartagena, was captured.

38th Front
Also known as the Ciro Trujillo Castaño Front, it was composed of up to 100 people. It operated mostly in the Casanare and the Boyacá Departments.

39th Front
Also known as the Joaquin Ballen Front, it was composed of anything between 40 and 300 people. It operated mostly in the Vichada Department. The front was led by El Cadete.

40th Front
Also known as the Jacobo Arenas Front, it was composed of up to 350 people. It operated mostly in the Meta Department.

42nd Front
Also known as the Combatientes de Cundinamarca Front, it was composed of up to 110 people. It operated mostly in the Cundinamarca Department.

43rd Front
It was composed of up to 300 people and operated mostly in the Meta Department.

44th Front
Also known as the Antonio Ricaurte Front, it was composed of up to 350 people. It operated mostly in the Meta Department.

45th Front
Also known as the Atanasio Girardot Front, it was composed of up to 150 people. It operated mostly in the Boyacá and Norte de Santander Departments.

51st Front
Also known as the Jaime Pardo Leal Front, it was composed of up to 80 people. It operated mostly in the Cundinamarca Department.

52nd Front
Also known as the Juan de la Cruz Front, it was composed of up to 120 people. It operated mostly in the Cundinamarca and Boyacá Departments.

53rd Front
Also known as the Jose A. Anzoategui Front, it was composed of up to 120 people. It operated mostly in the Meta and Cundinamarca Departments.

54th Front
Also known as the Angel Bonilla, it was composed of up to 50 militants. It operated mainly in the Meta Department.

55th Front
Also known as the Teófilo Forero Front, it was composed of around 150 militants, although the members of its urban network were much greater. It operated mostly in the Cundinamarca Department, and was considered the FARC's base in Bogotá. It was considered responsible for much of the terrorist activity that occurred in and around the capital.

56th Front
It was composed by up to 80 people and operated mostly in the Casanare and Boyacá Departments.

62nd Front
Also known as the Yarí Front. Operated in the Meta Department. On February 14, 2012, alias Dumar, his lover alias Gisella and two other rebels were killed by the army. Four other have been captured.

Antonio Nariño Front
It was an urban network composed of up to 50 individuals, and operated in Bogotá.

Urías Rondón Front

Columns and Companies
The following columns and companies also were part of the Eastern Bloc:
Compañía Marquetalia: Formed in January 2011. Operated in the Meta department. 54 members. According to a report in El Espectador, the column's medics treated the local population, providing basic health services where the state presence was nonexistent.
Mobile Column Alfonso Castellanos: Faction of the 10th front, composed by up to 120 members. Operated in the Arauca Department. His leader, "Gabino", was killed on August 24, 2008 by the Colombian Military.  The second-in-command, John Javier Ariza Gil, alias "Milton Diaz, has been killed on August 19, 2010  .
Mobile Column Juan José Rondón:  It was composed by up to 250 members and operated mostly in the Guaviare Department. Its last known leader, Octavio Salamanca, alias "Urias Cuéllar", was killed in 2001.
Special Forces: It is composed by up to 80 men and operated in what used to be the demilitarized zone.
Company Reinel Méndez: It was composed by up to 80 men and operated in what used to be the demilitarized zone.
Company Esteban Ramírez: It was composed by up to 80 men and operated in what used to be the demilitarized zone.
Company Manuela Beltrán: It was composed by up to 50 men and operated in the Cundinamarca Department. Its leader, Neftaly Murcia Vargas, known as “Camilo Tabaco”, was killed on September 3, 2008, according to the Colombian Army.
Company Abelardo Romero: It is composed by up to 40 men and operates in the Cundinamarca Department. On March 26, 2012, tens of member of the front were killed by an offensive of the army including the Company leader "Alonso Rivas". Yesid Borracho, the successor of Alonso Rivas, was killed on July 30.
Company Joaquín Ballén: It was composed by up to 140 men and operated in the Cundinamarca Department.
Company Che Guevara: Faction of the Eastern and Caribbean Blocs, composed by up to 120 members. Operated in what used to be the demilitarized zone.

See also
Western Bloc of the FARC-EP
Southern Bloc of the FARC-EP
Northwestern Bloc of the FARC-EP

Notes

FARC